This article lists the squads for the 2022 Malta International Women's Football Tournament, the second edition of the Malta International Women's Football Tournament. The cup consisted of a series of friendly games, and was held in Malta from 16 to 22 February 2022. The three national teams involved in the tournament registered a squad of 23 players.

The age listed for each player is on 16 February 2022, the first day of the tournament. The numbers of caps and goals listed for each player do not include any matches played after the start of tournament. The club listed is the club for which the player last played a competitive match prior to the tournament. The nationality for each club reflects the national association (not the league) to which the club is affiliated. A flag is included for coaches that are of a different nationality than their own national team.

Squads

Malta
Coach: Mark Gatt

The 22-player squad was announced on 11 February 2022. For the first match, Martina Borg was added to the squad in place of Emma Lipman who was unavailable for selection, and Lipman returned for the second match.

Moldova
Coach: Eduard Blănuță

The 18-player squad was announced on 4 February 2022. On 15 February 2022, Dumitriţa Prisăcari and Alexandra Trofimov withdrew due to health reasons and were replaced by Doina Ciobanu and Alina Chirica.

Morocco
Coach:  Reynald Pedros

The 23-player squad was announced on 17 February 2022.

Player representation

By club
Clubs with 3 or more players represented are listed.

By club nationality

By club federation

By representatives of domestic league

References

2022